Henda Ducados Pinto de Andrade (born 14 July 1964 in Rabat, Morocco) is a French-Angolan economist and sociologist. Ducados was an early promoter of microcredit in Angola and has directed external communications for a division of the French oil company Total since 2010.

Life

Youth and Education 
Henda Ducados Pinto de Andrade was born in the Moroccan capital city, Rabat, where her father Mário Pinto de Andrade was a well-known resistance fighter against Portuguese colonial power in Angola and was elected chairman of the Angolan liberation movement MPLA in 1960, as coordinator of Portuguese colonial organizations (Conferência das Organizações das Colónias Portuguesas (CONCP)). The aim of CONCP, founded in Casablanca, Morocco in 1961, was to connect and support the independence movements in the Portuguese colonies of Africa. Her mother, Sarah Maldoror, was a French-born filmmaker of Guadeloupian origin. The couple had two daughters, Henda and Annouchka de Andrade. 

In 1966, the family moved to Algiers, Algeria, where they were accepted by the Algerian independence movement FLN (National Liberation Front). The Algerian President Ahmed Ben Bella provided the family with a residence in Bab El Oued, a suburb of Algiers. Henda's father worked for the FLN and tried to support the MPLA party in Angola from Algeria. Meanwhile, her mother produced films for the FLN army. (Among other things, she worked with Gillo Pontecorvo on the film Battle of Algiers.) In 1970, an incident broke out between the filmmaker and a general of the FLN army that resulted in her arrest and subsequent deportation. The mother then moved with her two daughters to the Paris suburb of Saint-Denis, where Henda Ducados attended elementary and secondary school. Her father stayed in Africa. After he fell out with the MPLA, he lived in various former Portuguese colonies in Africa and the family members rarely saw each other. 

In the 1980s, Henda Ducados moved to Chicago and enrolled at Loyola University, where she earned a bachelor's degree in economics in 1992.

Advocate of microcredit in Angola 
During her studies at Loyola University, Ducados became interested in the principles of microcredit developed by Grameen Bank, which had become successful in Bangladesh. She decided to move to Angola in 1992, where she learned Portuguese and led a microcredit pilot project for an NGO there before receiving a scholarship to learn more about the principles of microcredit on-site in Bangladesh. In 1998, she founded the Rede Mulher (Women's Network) in Angola, an exchange and networking platform for women using microfinancing techniques. 

At the same time, she deepened her studies in economics and development with a focus on microcredits as part of a Masters at the Institute for Development Studies at the University of Sussex, which she graduated in 1998. To this she added a degree (MPhil) in "Gender and Development" at the London School of Economics and Political Science in 2001, with her paper titled "Women in War-Torn Societies: A Study of Households in Luanda's Peri-Urban Areas."

Professional positions 
In 2001, Ducados became deputy head of the Social Action Fund funded by the World Bank. 

In 2008, she took over the external communications unit for the Angolan branch of the French oil company Total.

Selected works 

 An All Men's Show? Angolan Women's Survival in the 30-Year War, in: Women and the Aftermath, Ausgabe 43, 2000, Seiten 11–22
 with Kajsa Pehrsson, Gabriela Cohen and Paulette Lopes. Towards gender equality in Angola: a profile on gender relations. Sida, Stockholm 2000. ISBN 9158689907.
 with Naiole Cohen dos Santos: Beyond inequalities: women in Angola: a profile of women in Angola. 2000. ISBN 0797417508.
 Pinto de Andrade: An intimate look. Caxinde tea, Luanda 2009. ISBN 9789728934859
Women in War-Torn Societies: A Study of Households in Luanda's Peri-Urban Areas. London School of Economics and Political Science, 2007, (English).

References 

   

1964 births
Living people
People from Rabat
Loyola University Chicago alumni
Alumni of the London School of Economics
Alumni of the University of Sussex
Angolan economists
Women economists